Stephen Schwartz is an American musical theater lyricist and composer. The following are a list of his wins and nominations for awards in film, music, and stage.

Schwartz has won three Academy Awards, three Grammy Awards, four Drama Desk Awards, and a Golden Globe Award. He has received six Tony Award nominations (also receiving the Isabelle Stevenson Award in 2015). He was given a star on the Hollywood Walk of Fame in 2008. Inducted into both the American Theater Hall of Fame and the Songwriters Hall of Fame in 2009.

Major awards

Academy Awards

Critics' Choice Movie Awards

Golden Globe Awards

Grammy Awards

Laurence Olivier Awards

Tony Awards

Miscellaneous awards

Annie Awards

Drama Desk Awards

Gold Derby Awards

Houston Film Critics Society Awards

Online Film & Television Association Awards

Outer Critics Circle Awards

Satellite Awards

Special honors

American Theater Hall of Fame

Hollywood Walk of Fame

Songwriters Hall of Fame

Other Honors
Schwartz received an Honorary Doctor of Fine Arts degree from Carnegie Mellon University in May 2015.

References

Schwartz, Stephen